Cordrazine are an Australian rock band formed in 1996 in Melbourne, Victoria. They released a top ten album on the Australian Recording Industry Association (ARIA) Albums Chart, From Here to Wherever in April 1998. The album was nominated for ARIA Award for Breakthrough Artist – Album at the ARIA Music Awards of 1998; however they disbanded in 1998. They reformed in 2009.

History
Cordrazine formed in mid-1996 as a rock music band in Melbourne, Victoria with Chris Ambrose on bass guitar, Hamish Cowan (ex-Blindside) as lead singer-songwriter and guitarist, and Rohan Heddle on drums. They were soon joined by Sam Holloway on keyboards and played in the local pub rock scene. They signed with the Rubber label and released their debut Extended Play (EP), Time to Leave in May 1997, which peaked at No. 42 on the Australian Recording Industry Association (ARIA) Singles Chart. It featured the track, "Crazy" which was placed at No. 17 on radio station Triple J's Hottest 100 in 1997.

"Clearlight", their next single, was released in August but did not reach the top 50. "Memorial Drive" was released in February 1998 ahead of their debut album, From Here to Wherever in April. The album peaked at No. 9 on the ARIA Albums Chart, and was nominated for 'ARIA Award for Breakthrough Artist – Album' at the ARIA Music Awards of 1998. Cordrazine had recorded a cover of the Hal David, Burt Bacharach song "Raindrops Keep Falling on My Head for a tribute album, To Hal and Bacharach released by Warner Music Group also in April. In November the group disbanded.

Members
Hamish Cowan – lead singer, guitar (1996–1998, 2009–Current)
Jethro Woodward – bass guitar, vocals (2009–Current)
Nick Batterham - guitar, vocals (2009-Current)
Rohan Heddle – drums (1996–1998, 2009–Current)
Sam Holloway – keyboards (1996–1998, 2009)
Chris Ambrose – bass guitar (1996–1998)

Discography

Studio albums

Extended plays

Singles

Awards

ARIA Music Awards
The ARIA Music Awards is an annual awards ceremony that recognises excellence, innovation, and achievement across all genres of Australian music. 

|-
| rowspan="2"| 1998
| From Here to Wherever
| ARIA Award for Breakthrough Artist – Album
| 
|-
| Nigel Derricks for Cordrazine From Here to Wherever
| ARIA Award for Engineer of the Year
|

References

General

  Note: Archived [on-line] copy has limited functionality.
  Note: [on-line] version established at White Room Electronic Publishing Pty Ltd in 2007 and was expanded from the 2002 edition.

Specific

Musical groups disestablished in 1998
Musical groups established in 1996
Victoria (Australia) musical groups